Jaw Shaw-kong (born 6 May 1950) is a Taiwanese media personality and politician. Jaw served a single term on the Taipei City Council before being elected to the Legislative Yuan from 1987 to 1991 and 1993 to 1994. Between Legislative Yuan stints, Jaw led the Environmental Protection Administration.

Early life
Jaw was born on 6 May 1950 in Keelung, Taiwan Province and moved to Luodong Township, Yilan County growing up. His ancestral home is in Hebei where his father, Jaw Yan-min, was born in 1922, and served in the Kuomintang's National Revolutionary Army and recruited in the Whampoa Military Academy when he was 16. He fought for the NRA in the Chinese Civil War and the Second Sino-Japanese War before he retreated to Taiwan in 1949.

Education
Jaw earned a degree in agricultural engineering from National Taiwan University in 1972, then attended Clemson University in the United States, where he obtained a master's degree in mechanical engineering.

Political career
Jaw was elected to the Taipei City Council in 1981 and served until 1986, when he was elected to the Legislative Yuan. In 1991, he was tapped to lead the Environmental Protection Administration. Against the wishes of his party, the Kuomintang, Jaw resigned from the EPA to seek reelection to the legislature. Despite the party's refusal to support him, Jaw won a record number of votes. He later became a member of the New Kuomintang Alliance and the Breakfast Club, set up in opposition to party chairman Lee Teng-hui. In August 1993, he co-founded the New Party. The next year, Jaw resigned his legislative seat to contest to the Taipei City mayoralty on behalf of the New Party, and lost to Chen Shui-bian. Jaw announced his intention to retire from politics in July 1996. 

In 2004, Jaw, a staunch supporter of unification, was invited to debate the referendum on Cross-Strait relations. He was named an adviser to Kuomintang candidates during the 2010 election cycle. In 2017, Jaw reiterated that he was an independent. In February 2021, Jaw disclosed that he had met with Han Kuo-yu in September 2020, who told Jaw that he should return to the Kuomintang and run for the party leadership. The restoration of Jaw's party membership was announced on 3 February 2021, and he subsequently expressed interest in contesting the 2021 party leadership election, as well as the primary for the 2024 presidential election cycle. Jaw stated on 28 April 2021 that he was no longer considering a run for the Kuomintang chairmanship.

Media career
Soon after announcing his withdrawal from politics in 1996, Jaw founded UFO Radio. He also owned  and served as its president. In 2006, Jaw acquired the Broadcasting Corporation of China. He has also hosted his own radio and television programs.

Personal life
Jaw is fluent in Taiwanese Hokkien. He is married to Liang Lei. Jaw's younger brother Chao Shao-wei has served as president of the Taipei Artist Agency Association.

References

1950 births
Anti-Japanese sentiment in Taiwan
New Party Members of the Legislative Yuan
Kuomintang Members of the Legislative Yuan in Taiwan
Members of the 1st Legislative Yuan in Taiwan
Members of the 2nd Legislative Yuan
Members of the Kuomintang
National Taiwan University alumni
Clemson University alumni
Taiwanese radio presenters
Taiwanese television presenters
New Taipei Members of the Legislative Yuan
Politicians of the Republic of China on Taiwan from Keelung
Taiwanese political party founders
Taiwanese environmentalists
Living people
Taiwanese Ministers of Environment
Taipei Members of the Legislative Yuan
Taipei City Councilors
Leaders of the New Party (Taiwan)